Betty Arlen (November 4, 1909 – August 4, 1966) was an American actress and dancer best known for her being selected as a WAMPAS Baby Star in 1925.

Biography
Born in Kentucky, Arlen moved to Hollywood in 1925, having been spotted by talent scouts while working as a stage dancer. At only 16 years of age, she was selected as one of thirteen girls that year to be WAMPAS Baby Stars, which included actresses June Marlowe and Violet La Plante, sister of Laura La Plante. Being selected as a "WAMPAS Baby Star" would be the highlight of her brief acting career.

In 1926 she had a supporting role in A Punch in the Nose, which was her only credited role. She would have two uncredited roles in 1928, and received only bit parts afterward, but struggled to stay in the business for some time.

She was married to theater manager, Louis Golden, but filed for divorce in 1932.<ref>[http://archives.chicagotribune.com/1932/08/20/page/7/article/betty-arlen-film-actress-files-suit-for-divorce "Betty Arlen, Film Actress, Files Suit For Divorce", Chicago Tribune", August 20, 1932]</ref>

She remained in the Los Angeles area, and died August 4, 1966, aged 56.

Filmography
 A Punch in the Nose (1926)
 Love at First Flight (Uncredited, 1928)
 The Chicken (Uncredited, 1928)
 I'll See You in My Dreams (Uncredited, 1951)
 April in Paris (Uncredited, 1952)
 It's Always Fair Weather'' (Uncredited, 1955)

References

External links

WAMPAS Baby Stars, 1925, Betty Arlen
MSN Movies

American silent film actresses
American film actresses
Actresses from Kentucky
1909 births
1966 deaths
20th-century American actresses
WAMPAS Baby Stars